This is a list of 123 species in Xenylla, a genus of springtails in the family Hypogastruridae.

Xenylla species

 Xenylla abichiana Winter, 1963 i c g
 Xenylla acauda Gisin, 1947 i c g
 Xenylla alba Folsom, 1932 i c g
 Xenylla aristides Fernando, 1959 i c g
 Xenylla atrata (Salmon, 1944) i c g
 Xenylla auka Christiansen & Bellinger, 1992 i c g
 Xenylla australiensis da Gama, 1974 i c g
 Xenylla babenkoi Stebaeva & Potapov in Babenko, Chernova, Potapov & Stebaeva, 1994 i c g
 Xenylla badakhshanica Yosii, 1966 i c g
 Xenylla bellingeri da Gama, 1969 i c g
 Xenylla betulae Fjellberg, 1985 i c g
 Xenylla bismarckensis da Gama, 1969 i c g
 Xenylla boerneri Axelson, 1905 i c g
 Xenylla brasiliensis da Gama, 1978 i c g
 Xenylla brevicauda Tullberg, 1869 i c g
 Xenylla brevisimilis Stach, 1949 i c g
 Xenylla brevispina Kinoshita, 1916 i c g
 Xenylla californica da Gama, 1976 i c g
 Xenylla canadensis Hammer, 1953 i c g
 Xenylla capensis Weiner & Najt, 1991 i c g
 Xenylla capitata Thibaud & Massoud, 1980 i c g
 Xenylla carolinensis Wray, 1946 i c g
 Xenylla cassagnaui da Gama, 1983 i c g
 Xenylla caudata Jordana, 1993 i c g
 Xenylla cavarai Caroli, 1914 i c g
 Xenylla cavernarum Jackson, 1927 i c g
 Xenylla christianseni da Gama, 1974 i c g
 Xenylla claggi Wise, 1970 i c g
 Xenylla collis Bacon, 1914 i c g
 Xenylla constricta von Olfers, 1907 i c g
 Xenylla continentalis Stebaeva & Potapov in Babenko, Chernova, Potapov & Stebaeva, 1994 i c g
 Xenylla convexopyga Lee, Park & Park, 2005 i c g
 Xenylla corticalis Börner, 1901 i c g
 Xenylla deharvengi da Gama, 1983 i c g
 Xenylla dotata Lee, Park & Park, 2005 i c g
 Xenylla duchesnea Wray, 1958 i c g
 Xenylla fernandesi da Gama, 1974 i c g
 Xenylla franzi Steiner, 1955 i c g
 Xenylla gamae Cardoso, 1967 i c g
 Xenylla gisini Cardoso, 1968 i c g
 Xenylla gomerensis Fjellberg, 1992 i c g
 Xenylla granulosa da Gama, 1966 i c g
 Xenylla greensladeae da Gama, 1974 i c g
 Xenylla grisea Axelson, 1900 i c g b
 Xenylla hadialii Baijal, 1955 i c g
 Xenylla hawaiiensis da Gama, 1969 i c g
 Xenylla helena Scott, 1937 i c g
 Xenylla hexagona Fjellberg, 1992 i c g
 Xenylla hodori Neves & Mendonça, 2017 g
 Xenylla humicola (Fabricius, 1780) i c g
 Xenylla inermis Olfers, 1907 i c g
 Xenylla jamaicensis da Gama, 1969 i c g
 Xenylla jocquei Andrè, 1988 i c g
 Xenylla kenyensis da Gama, 1969 i c g
 Xenylla kirgisica Martynova, 1976 i c g
 Xenylla laurisilvae Fjellberg, 1992 i c g
 Xenylla lawrencei da Gama, 1967 i c g
 Xenylla lesnei Denis, 1935 i c g
 Xenylla littoralis Womersley, 1933 i c g
 Xenylla longicauda Folsom, 1898 i c g
 Xenylla longispina Uzel, 1890 i c g
 Xenylla longistriata Lee, Park & Park, 2005 i c g
 Xenylla louisiana da Gama, 1976 i c g
 Xenylla malasica da Gama, 1969 i c g
 Xenylla malayana Salmon, 1951 i c g
 Xenylla manusiensis da Gama, 1967 i c g
 Xenylla marina Lee, Park & Park, 2005 i c g
 Xenylla maritima Tullberg, 1869 i c g
 Xenylla martynovae Dunger, 1983 i c g
 Xenylla mediterranea Gama, 1964 g
 Xenylla mongolica Martynova, 1975 i c g
 Xenylla mucronata Axelson, 1903 i c g
 Xenylla murphyi da Gama, 1969 i c g
 Xenylla myrmecophila Stebaeva & Potapov in Babenko, Chernova, Potapov & Stebaeva, 1994 i c g
 Xenylla neivai da Gama, 1966 i c g
 Xenylla nigeriana da Gama & Lasebikan, 1976 i c g
 Xenylla nirae da Gama & de Oliveira, 1994 i c g
 Xenylla nitida Tullberg, 1871 i c g
 Xenylla obscura Imms, 1912 i c g
 Xenylla occidentalis Womersley, 1933 i c g
 Xenylla octooculata Carpenter, 1928 i c g
 Xenylla orientalis Handschin, 1932 i c g
 Xenylla osetica Stebaeva & Potapov in Babenko, Chernova, Potapov & Stebaeva, 1994 i c g
 Xenylla pallescens (Scott, 1960) i c g
 Xenylla paludis (Bacon, 1914) i c g
 Xenylla piceeta Stebaeva & Potapov in Babenko, Chernova, Potapov & Stebaeva, 1994 i c g
 Xenylla portoricensis da Gama, 1976 i c g
 Xenylla proxima Denis, 1931 i c g
 Xenylla pseudobrevicauda Ritter, 1911 i c g
 Xenylla pseudomaritima James, 1933 i c g
 Xenylla pyrenaica Cassagnau, 1959 i c g
 Xenylla raynalae Najt, Thibaud & Weiner, 1990 i c g
 Xenylla reducta Prabhoo, 1971 i c g
 Xenylla rhodesiensis Womersley, 1926 i c g
 Xenylla saludoi Izarra, 1970 i c g
 Xenylla schillei Börner, 1903 i c g
 Xenylla simberloffi da Gama, 1974 i c g
 Xenylla similata Denis, 1948 i c g
 Xenylla sincta Baijal, 1956 i c g
 Xenylla spinosissima Najt & Rubio, 1978 i c g
 Xenylla stachi da Gama, 1966 i c g
 Xenylla stepposa Stebaeva, 1980 i c g
 Xenylla subacauda Stebaeva & Potapov in Babenko, Chernova, Potapov & Stebaeva, 1994 i c g
 Xenylla subbellingeri da Gama, 1976 i c g
 Xenylla subcavernarum da Gama, 1969 i c g
 Xenylla tadzhika Martynova, 1968 i c g
 Xenylla thailandensis da Gama, 1986 i c g
 Xenylla thiensis Deharveng & Najt in Tillier, 1988 i c g
 Xenylla trisubloba Stebaeva & Potapov in Babenko, Chernova, Potapov & Stebaeva, 1994 i c g
 Xenylla tullbergi Börner, 1903 i c g
 Xenylla uniseta da Gama, 1963 i c g
 Xenylla victoriana da Gama, 1979 i c g
 Xenylla vilhenaorum da Gama, 1966 i c g
 Xenylla villiersi Thibaud, 1963 i c g
 Xenylla welchi Folsom, 1916 i c g
 Xenylla westraliensis da Gama, 1974 i c g
 Xenylla wilsoni da Gama, 1974 i c g
 Xenylla womersleyi da Gama, 1974 i c g
 Xenylla xavieri da Gama, 1959 i c g
 Xenylla yosiiana da Gama, 1971 i c g
 Xenylla yucatana Mills in Pearse, 1938 i c g
 Xenylla zairensis Martynova, 1979 i c g
 Xenylla zavattari (Tarsia in Curia, 1939) i c g

Data sources: i = ITIS, c = Catalogue of Life, g = GBIF, b = Bugguide.net

References

Xenylla
Xenylla